The Riot Tour was the thirteenth headlining concert tour by American country music trio Rascal Flatts, in support of their ninth studio album Rewind (2014). The tour began May 5, 2015 in Cozumel, Mexico and ended on November 7 of that year in Albuquerque, New Mexico. It grossed over $18.7 million and was ranked fifty-seventh on Pollstar's Year End list on the Top 200 North American Tours of 2015.

Background
Rascal Flatts first announced the tour on January 20, 2015. The tour follows their Las Vegas spring residency.

Opening acts

Lauren Alaina
Seth Alley
Chase Bryant
Chris Janson
Scotty McCreery
Ashley Monroe
RaeLynn
Mo Pitney

Setlist
Average setlist for the tour:
"Stand"
"Me and My Gang"
"Take Me to Church" 
"What Hurts the Most"/"To Love Someday" 
"Love You Out Loud"
"Why Wait"
"Riot"
"Fast Cars and Freedom"
"Easy"
"These Days"
"Mayberry"
"I'm Movin' On"
"Prayin' for Daylight"
"Summer Nights"
"My Wish"
"She's Leaving"
"Rewind"
"Take Me There"
"Bless the Broken Road"/"Open Arms" 
"Banjo"
Encore
"Here's to You"
"Life is a Highway"

Tour dates

List of festivals and fairs
 This concert is a part of the Shaky Boots Festival.
 This concert is a part of the Carolina Country Music Festival.
 This concert is a part of the 99.5 WYCD Downtown Hoedown.
 This concert is a part of the Buckeye Country Superfest.
 This concert is a part of the Illinois State Fair.
 This concert is a part of the Country Rock & Rewind Festival.
 This concert is a part of the Rolling Stones – Zip Code Tour.
 This Concert is a part of the KICKS 101.5 Country Fair & Tim McGraw's Shotgun Rider Tour

Cancelled Shows

References

2015 concert tours
Rascal Flatts concert tours